Louise M. Tesmer (born December 25, 1942) is an American lawyer, judge, and former politician.  She was a Wisconsin circuit court judge for 12 years in the Milwaukee County circuit (1989–2001), and has continued to serve as a reserve judge since her retirement.  Prior to her judicial service, she served sixteen years in the Wisconsin State Assembly, representing the city of Milwaukee as a Democrat.

Early life and career
Born in Milwaukee, Wisconsin, Tesmer graduated from Bay View High School. She then received her bachelor's degree from University of Wisconsin–Milwaukee in 1964 and went on to earn her J.D. from University of Wisconsin Law School in 1967.

Public office
Even before graduating from law school she ran for her first public office.  At age 23, she was elected municipal court judge in the Milwaukee suburb of St. Francis in the 1966 spring election.  After graduating from law school, she was hired as an assistant district attorney for Milwaukee County, which was her primary employment until her election to the Wisconsin State Assembly in 1972.

In 1972, Tesmer announced she would launch a primary challenge against 24-year incumbent U.S. Congressman Clement J. Zablocki.  Tesmer established a platform on opposition to the Vietnam War and support for progressive tax reform.  She asserted that Zablocki had been too supportive of President Richard Nixon's war policies, and had lost touch with the needs of his constituents.  Tesmer withdrew her candidacy, however, when another "peace" candidate—Grant Waldo—announced he would enter the race against Zablocki.

Instead, Tesmer launched a primary challenge against 12-year incumbent Democratic state representative John E. McCormick, in the newly drawn 19th State Assembly district.  Before the primary, however, McCormick was granted a judicial appointment and quit the race.  Tesmer ultimately faced five other candidates in the primary for the now-open seat.  In the September primary, she prevailed with 45% of the six-way vote and went on to take nearly 70% of the general election vote over Republican Ebner Luetzow.  She went on to win reelection 8 times, serving until 1989.

During her time in the Assembly, Tesmer served as chairperson of the Assembly Committee on Financial Institutions and Insurance (1987–1989) and was a member of the Judiciary Committee for her entire time in the legislature.  She was also elected Speaker pro tempore (then referred to as "Deputy Speaker") by her caucus for the 1981–1982 session of the legislature, becoming the first woman to serve in the Assembly leadership.

In 1989, Tesmer entered the race for Milwaukee County's newest branch of the Wisconsin circuit courts.  In a crowded seven-person nonpartisan primary, she prevailed again with 38%, and went on to win the April election with 63%.  Two of her former primary opponents in the election—Daniel L. Konkol and Robert Crawford—would later go on to serve as circuit court judges.  She was reelected in 1995 and retired at the end of her second term in 2001.  As of 2021, she continues to serve as a reserve judge in the 1st judicial administrative district.

Personal life

Tesmer appeared on the popular television gameshow What's My Line? in 1966, with Betty White and Allen Ludden as guest panelists.

Electoral history

Wisconsin Assembly, 19th district (1972–1980)

Wisconsin Assembly, 1st district (1982)

Wisconsin Assembly, 19th district (1984–1988)

Wisconsin Circuit Court (1989, 1995)

| colspan="6" style="text-align:center;background-color: #e9e9e9;"| Nonpartisan Primary, February 21, 1989

| colspan="6" style="text-align:center;background-color: #e9e9e9;"| General Election, April 4, 1989

References

|-

|-

1942 births
Living people
Politicians from Milwaukee
Lawyers from Milwaukee
Wisconsin lawyers
Wisconsin state court judges
Democratic Party members of the Wisconsin State Assembly
Women state legislators in Wisconsin
University of Wisconsin–Milwaukee alumni
University of Wisconsin Law School alumni
21st-century American women